Martin Hunt (born 12 February 1970) is an Australian politician. He was the Liberal National Party member for Nicklin in the Queensland Legislative Assembly from 2017 to 2020.

Prior to his election, Hunt was a Sergeant in the Queensland Police Service, assigned to the Sunshine Coast (Nambour) PCYC (Police-Citizens Youth Club).

Sworn in to the Queensland Police Service on 7 July 1989 after training 18 months as a Cadet, Hunt served 30 years as a Queensland Police Officer serving in Inala, Oxley District CIB, Sunshine Coast Child Abuse Unit and CPIU before being appointed officer in charge PCYC Sunshine Coast in May 2000.

Hunt made his inaugural speech on 20 March 2018 paying tribute to his family, police  colleagues and volunteers.  He described his catholic school upbringing, values instilled over time and passion for police mental health and improvements to the justice system.  His inaugural speech can be viewed here

References

1970 births
Living people
Members of the Queensland Legislative Assembly
Liberal National Party of Queensland politicians
Australian police officers
Place of birth missing (living people)